The Master Brewers Association of the Americas (MBAA) was founded in 1887. It publishes the Technical Quarterly, a technical journal; some of the articles are peer-reviewed.

One of the original officers elected at the Association's first convention in March 1887 was William Gerst Sr. who would serve as its second president 1889–1891. A widely respect brewer in Nashville, Tennessee, Gerst is also remembered for winning the 1910 Kentucky Derby with his horse Donau.

See also  
Master Brewers Association of the Americas District Northwest Records, 1935-2016

Institute of Brewing and Distilling

Beer organizations
Professional associations based in the United States
Organizations established in 1887